Franciscus Wilhelmus Maria Broers (3 September 1944, Tilburg – 9 December 2013, Utrecht) was a Dutch writer, who published using the pseudonym Jacq Firmin Vogelaar. In 1992 he won the Ferdinand Bordewijk Prijs for his novel De dood als meisje van acht. In 2006 he won the Constantijn Huygens Prize for his collected works.

Works

 
 
 
 
 
 
 
 
 
 
 
 
 
  (using female pseudonym Koba Swart)

References

1944 births
2013 deaths
20th-century Dutch novelists
20th-century Dutch male writers
20th-century essayists
20th-century translators
21st-century Dutch novelists
21st-century essayists
Constantijn Huygens Prize winners
Academic staff of the Delft University of Technology
Dutch essayists
Ferdinand Bordewijk Prize winners
French–Dutch translators
German–Dutch translators
Male essayists
Dutch male novelists
People from Tilburg
Radboud University Nijmegen alumni
21st-century Dutch male writers
20th-century pseudonymous writers
21st-century pseudonymous writers